Le Pain Quotidien (French for the daily bread) is an international chain of bakery-restaurants. It sells baked goods, bread, salads, sandwiches, beverages, and tartines.

Le Pain Quotidien operates more than 260 bakery-restaurant locations worldwide in 20 countries, including Belgium, the Netherlands, the United Kingdom, France, India, Switzerland, Brazil, Chile, Mexico, Colombia, Turkey, Spain, United Arab Emirates, Kuwait, Qatar, Russia, Argentina, Japan, Hong Kong, and the United States. The United States, United Kingdom, Belgium and Paris restaurants are fully company-owned and operated, while all other international Le Pain Quotidien restaurants are franchised.

A common theme in all Le Pain Quotidien locations is a long, wooden "communal table".

History
Founder Alain Coumont opened Le Pain Quotidien on 26 October 1990 at 16 rue Dansaert in Brussels. As a young chef, Coumont was dissatisfied with the quality of bread available in Brussels, so he began making his own, mixing flour, water and salt into the familiar loaves of his childhood. He furnished the store with cabinets scoured from antique stores and a large table made of wood reclaimed from the floors of retired Belgian trains purchased at a local flea market: the first of Le Pain Quotidien's communal tables.

The first location in the United States opened on Madison Avenue in New York City in 1997.

By 2005, the founder was receiving 50 emails per day from people wanting to secure a franchise.

In 2011, the company had a public relations incident when a customer in New York City found a mouse in her salad.

In 2016, Doug Satzman became CEO of the U.S. operations and Vincent Herbert became global CEO.

In March 2018, Vincent Herbert resigned.

In December 2019, Cobepa, majority owned by Spoelberch, increased its stake in the company from 32% to 43% and Norac sold its 25% interest.

In May 2020, the parent company filed for insolvency in Belgium and the United States division filed bankruptcy. The same month the parent company signed a deal agreement with the New York-based Aurify Brands which will provide a bridge financing of $522,000 to continue the operations and to ultimate the acquisition of all the U.S. units for $3 million. Aurify Brands planned to reopen at least 35 units and to create 1,000 jobs.

References

External links

 

Restaurants in Belgium
Bakeries of Belgium
Restaurant chains
Bakery cafés
Companies based in Brussels
Companies that filed for Chapter 11 bankruptcy in 2020
Belgian companies established in 1990
Restaurants established in 1990